Devin J. Stewart is a professor of Islamic studies and Arabic language and literature. His research interests include Islamic law, the Qur'an, Islamic schools and branches and varieties of Arabic.

Education
Stewart graduated magna cum laude with an A.B. in Near Eastern studies from Princeton University in 1984 after completing a 143-page long senior thesis titled "Three Wise Men: The Safawi Religious Institution 1576 - 1629." He completed the Center for Arabic Study Abroad's program at the American University in Cairo, and then earned his PhD with distinction in Arabic and Islamic studies at the University of Pennsylvania six years later.

Career
Stewart has taught Arabic studies, Islamic studies and Middle Eastern studies at the Department of Middle Eastern and South Asian Studies at Emory University for the past two decades. He also serves on the editorial board for the Library of Arabic Literature. He has also functioned as a guest lecturer on university courses in Jewish studies.

Much of Stewart's work has focused on the reconstruction of early Muslim legal theory based on ancient texts. He has also called attention to infrequently studied genres of Arabic literature such as Maqama.

Work

Articles
"Ibn Zaydún," a biography of Ibn Zaydún, taken from Al-Andalus, pgs. 306-317. Eds. María Rosa Menocal, Raymond P. Scheindlin and Michael Sells. Digital edition. Cambridge: Cambridge University Press, 2006.
Impoliteness Formulae: The Cognate Curse in Egyptian Arabic. Journal of Semitic Studies, 1997. Vol. 42, pgs. 327-360.

Books
Islamic Legal Orthodoxy: Twelver Shiite Responses to the Sunni Legal System. Salt Lake City: University of Utah Press, 1998.

Conference and lectures
Conjectural Emendation and Anomalies in the Qur'anic Text, delivered at the Stanford Humanities Center, July 31, 2009.
Reading Manuscripts of the Qur'an: The Evolution of Arabic Script, delivered at the Michael C. Carlos Museum, October 13, 2010.
The Sura as Sermon: Generic Questions and the Composition of the Qur'an, delivered at the University of Chicago Divinity School, November 9, 2012.
The Theory of Love: Ibn Da'ud al-Zahiri's Book of the Flower, delivered at the Center for the Study of Law and Religion at Emory, March 27, 2003.

Edited works
Texts and Studies on the Qurʾān, with Gerhard Böwering and Bilal Orfali. Leiden: Brill Publishers. ISSN 1567-2808

Research projects
The Terminal Marital Contract in Islamic Law and Practice, in collaboration with the Center for the Study of Law and Religion at Emory, 2001.

References

External links
Dr. Stewart's resume at Emory University

American Islamic studies scholars
Living people
Year of birth missing (living people)
Religion academics
Princeton University alumni
Emory University faculty